Aristobia umbrosa is a species of beetle in the family Cerambycidae. It was described by James Thomson in 1865, originally under the genus Celosterna. It is known from Malaysia, Borneo and Sumatra. It contains the varietas Aristobia umbrosa var. variefasciata.

References

Lamiini
Beetles described in 1865